Samuel Akerly ( – ) was an American physician and founder of the New York Institute for the Education of the Blind. 

He graduated from Columbia College in 1804. He contributed to medical and scientific periodicals, was active in establishing institutions for the education of deaf people, and published an Essay on the Geology of the Hudson River (1820) and Observations on Deafness (1821). Akerly died on 6 July 1845 in Staten Island.

Created via preloaddraft
1785 births
1845 deaths